Michael Simms is an American poet, novelist and literary publisher. His satiric novel Bicycles of the Gods: A Divine Comedy and his YA fantasy novel The Green Mage were published by Madville Publishing, and his most recent poetry collections are American Ash (2020) and Nightjar (2021), both published by  Ragged Sky Press. His poems have been published in journals and magazines including Scientific American, Poetry Magazine, Black Warrior Review, Mid-American Review, Pittsburgh Quarterly, Southwest Review, and West Branch.  His poems have also appeared in Poem-a-Day published by the Academy of American Poets and been read by Garrison Keillor on the nationally syndicated radio show The Writer's Almanac. Simms's poems have been translated into Spanish, Russian and Arabic.

Early life 
Born in 1954 in Houston, Texas, Simms attended the School of Irish Studies in Dublin, Ireland; Southern Methodist University (BA, 1976); and the University of Iowa (MFA, 1978).

Career 
In 1998, Simms founded the literary publisher Autumn House Press in Pittsburgh, Pennsylvania where he served as Editor-in-Chief until 2016. He has been the lead editor on over 100 full-length books of poetry, fiction, and nonfiction by authors such as Gerald Stern, Ed Ochester, Martha Rhodes, Jo McDougall, Chana Bloch, Samuel Ligon, Samuel Hazo, Sue Ellen Thompson, Frank Gaspar, Sheryl St. Germain, Judith Vollmer, Steven Schwartz, and Richard Jackson, as well as ten anthologies of fiction, non-fiction and poetry. His edited volumes have been reviewed in The New York Times Book Review, The London Times Literary Supplement, The Jerusalem Post, American Poetry Review, and many other periodicals. Simms is the founder of the online literary magazine Coal Hill Review and the publisher of the political magazine Vox Populi. Simms, who is a vegan and environmental activist, has a certificate in Plant-Based Nutrition from Cornell University. He identifies as being 'on the autism spectrum' and lives with his wife Eva, a psychologist, in the historic neighborhood of Mount Washington overlooking the city of Pittsburgh.

Simms has won many fellowships, grants and awards for his work, including a 2011 Certificate of Recognition from the Pennsylvania Legislature for his contribution to the arts. In addition to his literary career, Simms has written and published on health, nutrition and the environment, having earned a certificate in plant-based nutrition from Cornell University (2015). From 1979-1987 he served on the faculty of Southern Methodist University and from 2005-2013 in the Chatham University Master of Fine Arts Program in Creative Writing.

Critical response 
Regarding Simms' collection American Ash, the poet and critic Chard deNiord has said:"Michael Simms lays bare his personal history in American Ash with formidable honesty and direct speech, testifying with “a cold eye” to both the heuristic and cathartic power of poetry. In speech that’s direct, lyrical, spontaneous, raw, and expansive, Simms braves a wide array of subjects that range from his sister’s suicide, the 1982 El Calabozo massacre in El Salvador,  a Vietnam vet’s memory of a slaughter of innocents, and the demise of the American Ash, to mention only a few. And there are ecstatic poems as well in which such immense particulars as the marriage bed, evening, Simms’ robust son, and the hummingbird betray a heroic magnanimity. With a beat-like voice that’s spontaneous, raw, and irrepressible, Simms writes with the courage of a witness and the wisdom of a survivor. These poems leap, lament, pierce, transcend, delve, witness, praise, and testify to the curative power of poetry."Regarding Simms' collection Nightjar, the poet and classicist Rachel Hadas wrote:“This powerful collection offers personal and global truths that are hard to say out loud; one poem even helpfully coins the words we need. But all the words deployed by Michael Simms are honest and urgent. ‘The Ruins,’ ‘Flood and Fire,’ and the title poem recall the darkly vatic voice of Brecht’s late lyrics. Yet, Simms always sounds like himself: plainspoken, intimate, vulnerable, courageous. Both heartening and heartbreaking, Nightjar is an irreplaceable book.”

Books
Poetry Collections
 Nightjar (Princeton, New Jersey: Ragged Sky Press, 2021)
 American Ash (Princeton, New Jersey: Ragged Sky Press, 2020)
 Black Stone (Pittsburgh, Pennsylvania: Monkey Sea Editions, 2009)
 The Happiness of Animals (Pittsburgh, Pennsylvania: Monkey Sea Editions, 2006)
 The Fire-eater (Dallas, Texas: Firewheel Press, 1989)
 Migration (Portland, Oregon: Breitenbush Books, 1985)
 Notes on Continuing Light (Des Moines: Blue Buildings, 1981)

Novels
 Bicycles of the Gods: A Divine Comedy (Dallas, Texas: Madville Publishing, 2022)
 The Green Mage (Dallas, Texas: Madville Publishing, 2023)

Nonfiction
 Longman Dictionary of Poetic Terms (co-author with Jack Myers, New York: Longman, 1989)
 Longman Dictionary and Handbook of Poetry, (co-author with Jack Myers, New York: Longman, 1985)

Anthologies Edited
 The Autumn House Anthology of Contemporary American Poetry (Pittsburgh: Autumn House Press, 2011, 2015, 2017)
 O. Henry’s Texas Stories (co-editor with Marian McClintock, Dallas: Stillpoint Press, 1986)

References 

2. Encyclopedia.com

Sources
Contemporary Authors Online. The Gale Group, 2003. PEN (Permanent Entry Number):  0000149473.

External links 
  Official Website for Michael Simms 
  Poems by Michael Simms on Poetry Foundation website
  Recordings of Michael Simms reading his poems on Voetica website
 'Autumn House Press'
 'Vox Populi'
 Poems: Poetry Magazine > Archives > January 2000 > Poems by Michael Simms
  A Review of American Ash by Michael Simms

1954 births
Living people
American male poets
Writers from Pittsburgh
Chatham University faculty
American publishers (people)
Poets from Texas
University of Iowa alumni
Southern Methodist University alumni
American book editors